Diloma subrostratum, common name the mudflat top shell, is a species of small sea snail, a marine gastropod mollusk in the family Trochidae, the top snails.

Description
The length of the adult shell of this species varies between 11 mm and 32 mm. The solid, conical shell is suborbicular. It is often more or less black, with close wavy longitudinal yellow lines. The spire is short  with five whorls. The last whorl is large, rounded, with its hinder part with three to six spiral keels. The axis is imperforated. The inside of the aperture is smooth and silvery.

Distribution
This common estuarine species is endemic to New Zealand, occurring in the North and South Islands, and in Stewart Island.

References

 Miller M & Batt G, Reef and Beach Life of New Zealand, William Collins (New Zealand) Ltd, Auckland, New Zealand 1973
 Powell A. W. B., New Zealand Mollusca, William Collins Publishers Ltd, Auckland, New Zealand 1979 
 Donald K.M., Kennedy M. & Spencer H.G. (2005) The phylogeny and taxonomy of austral monodontine topshells (Mollusca: Gastropoda: Trochidae), inferred from DNA sequences. Molecular Phylogenetics and Evolution 37: 474-483.
 Bruce A. Marshall, Molluscan and brachiopod taxa introduced by F. W. Hutton in The New Zealand journal of science; Journal of the Royal Society of New Zealand, Volume 25, Issue 4, 1995

External links
 
 New Zealand Mollusca: Diloma subrostrata

subrostratum
Gastropods of New Zealand
Gastropods described in 1835